L. formosa may refer to:

 Lambertia formosa, a shrub endemic to New South Wales
 Leptoxis formosa, an extinct snail
 Leycesteria formosa, a deciduous shrub
 Libertia formosa, a synonym of Libertia chilensis, an ornamental plant
 Lodderena formosa, a sea snail
 Lorryia formosa, an acariform mite